Columbus is a census-designated place located in Columbus Township, Warren County in the state of Pennsylvania, United States.  The community is located along the famous U.S. Route 6 in northwestern Warren County. As of the 2010 census, the population was 824 residents. Columbus is within a few miles of the city of Corry, located in Erie County.

Demographics

Notable person
 Elnora Monroe Babcock, suffragist

References

Census-designated places in Warren County, Pennsylvania
Census-designated places in Pennsylvania